Allendale East is a town and locality in the Australian state of South Australia located in the state's south-east about  south-east of the state capital of Adelaide and about  south of the municipal seat of Mount Gambier.

The 2016 Australian census which was conducted in August 2016 reports that Allendale East had a population of 472 of which 276 lived in its town centre.

Allendale East is located within the federal division of Barker, the state electoral district of Mount Gambier and the local government area of the District Council of Grant.

References

Towns in South Australia
Limestone Coast